The Wake Forest Demon Deacons men's basketball team represents Wake Forest University in NCAA Division I college basketball and competes in the Atlantic Coast Conference (ACC). Wake Forest made the Final Four in 1962. Through the years, the program has produced many NBA players, among them are Hall of Famer Tim Duncan, 12× All-Star Chris Paul, 1× All-Star Jeff Teague, Sixth Man of the Year Rodney Rogers, and 1× All-Star Josh Howard. The Demon Deacons have won the Atlantic Coast Conference tournament four times, in 1961, 1962, 1995, and 1996. Wake Forest has appeared in 23 NCAA tournaments, most recently appearing in 2017. The current coach is Steve Forbes, who was hired on April 30, 2020.

History

Dave Odom era (1989–2001) 
In 1989, Wake Forest would name Dave Odom as its new head coach. During his 12 seasons, Odom led the Demon Deacons to back-to-back ACC men's basketball tournament championship's in 1995 where the team defeated North Carolina and 1996 by defeating Georgia Tech. Tim Duncan would also win back to back-to-back ACC Player of the Year awards in 1996 and 1997.

Skip Prosser era (2001–2007)

Prosser began his career at Wake Forest in 2001 and led the Demon Deacons to the NCAA tournament in each of his first four years there. Prosser is credited for sparking participation in the Wake Forest student Screamin' Demons and increasing attendance with game-time antics, like having the Demon Deacon mascot enter Lawrence Joel on a Harley Davidson and filling the coliseum with Zombie Nation's "Kernkraft 400" at tip-off and when the Deacons would go on a run. During Prosser's tenure as head coach, home season tickets sold out for the first time ever in 2004. During the 2004–05 season, the team was ranked #1 by the Associated Press for the first time in the school's history and won a school-record 27 games. At Wake Forest, Prosser won 100 games faster than all but two ACC coaches. In 2003, his Demon Deacons squad became the first from the ACC to ever lead the nation in rebounding. In the summer of 2007, Prosser had organized what was said to be a top-five recruiting class for the upcoming year.

Every senior whom Prosser coached earned his degree in four years.

Danny Manning era (2014–2020)

On April 8, 2014, Wake Forest announced the hiring of Danny Manning. Despite high expectations entering his first season, the Demon Deacons only finished with a 13–19 overall record and 5–13 record in the ACC. They would lose to Virginia Tech in the first round of the ACC tournament.

In Manning's second season, Wake Forest's 2015 recruiting class added the commitments of John Collins, Bryant Crawford, and Doral Moore. However, Wake Forest would have another disappointing season finishing the year 11–20 on the regular season and a 2–16 overall record in ACC play.

During Manning's third year at helm, despite losing seniors Codi Miller-McIntyre and Devin Thomas, Wake Forest started the 2016–17 season off very strong. Wake Forest entered the 2017 ACC tournament as the 10th seed and defeated Boston College in the first round of the ACC Tournament. On March 8, 2017, Wake Forest lost to Virginia Tech in the second round of the ACC Tournament. The team also earned a bid in the NCAA Tournament. Wake Forest finished 19–14 on the season and 9–9 in ACC play finishing 10th in the standings. Following the 2019–20 season, after six seasons with the team, Manning was relieved of his duties as head coach.

Steve Forbes era (2020–present) 
On April 30, 2020, Steve Forbes was named as the new head coach for Wake Forest.

Coaches

Current coaching staff 
 Head Coach – Steve Forbes
 Asst. Coach – Jason Shay
 Asst. Coach – BJ McKie
 Asst. Coach – Brooks Savage
 Director of Basketball Operations - Frank Davis

Former head coaches
 Danny Manning (2014–2020)
 Jeff Bzdelik (2010–14)
 Dino Gaudio (2007–10)
 Skip Prosser (2001–07)
 Dave Odom (1989–2001)
 Bob Staak (1985–89)
 Carl Tacy (1972–85)
 Jack McCloskey (1966–72)
 Jack Murdock (1965–66)
 Bones McKinney (1957–65)
 Murray Greason (1933–43, 1945–57; no team in 1944)
 Fred Emmerson (1931–33)
 Pat Miller (1928–30)
 James A. Baldwin (1926–28)
 R. S. Hayes (1925–26, 1930–31)
 Hank Garrity (1923–25, simultaneously football coach)
 Phil Utley (1922–23)
 James L. White Jr. (1920–21)
 Bill Holding (1919–20, 1921–22)
 Irving Carlyle (1918–19)
 E. T. MacDonnell (1917–18)
 J. R. Crozier (1906–17)

Facilities

Game day

Lawrence Joel Veterans Memorial Coliseum
The Lawrence Joel Veterans Memorial Coliseum (also known as The Joel) is a 14,407-seat multi-purpose arena in Winston-Salem, North Carolina. It was named after Lawrence Joel, an Army medic from Winston-Salem who was awarded the Medal of Honor in 1967 for action in Vietnam on November 8, 1965. The memorial was designed by James Ford in New York, and includes the poem "The Fallen" engraved on an interior wall. It is home to Wake Forest's men's and women's basketball teams, and is adjacent to the Dixie Classic Fairgrounds. The arena replaced the old Winston-Salem War Memorial Coliseum, which was torn down for the LJVM Coliseum's construction.

Banners hang in the rafters commemorating past players' retired numbers (including Chris Paul, Tim Duncan, and Randolph Childress) and the late Skip Prosser. There are also banners recognizing the Demon Deacons' past NCAA and ACC successes. The arena is home to the Screamin' Demon student section. Wake Forest's black and gold tie-dyed apparel and "Zombie Nation" were both implemented upon Prosser's arrival at Wake Forest.

Practice

Miller Center
The Miller Center is the basketball team's on-campus home. It houses the players' locker rooms, team meeting rooms, coaches' offices, and the Dave Budd Practice Gym. The players utilize the Miller Center for practice, meetings, academic work, and relaxing with their teammates.

The Dave Budd Practice Gym has a full-length court, six stand alone baskets, bleacher seating and banners honoring some of the best players to ever don the black and gold. The locker room includes a separate player lounge which features multiple large flat screen TVs, multiple entertainment systems (Blu-ray, streaming software, and gaming systems) plus the latest video software, as well as dedicated equipment and training rooms. On August 7, 2018, Chris Paul donated $2.5 million to the Wake Forest basketball program.

Sutton Sports Performance Center/Shah Basketball Complex
The grand opening for the Sutton Sports Performance Center and the Shah Basketball Complex occurred in September, 2019 and provides Wake Forest with a state-of-the-art center for strength and conditioning and nutrition as well as providing space for coaches offices, team meeting rooms, and heritage areas that celebrate the success of Wake Forest's sports programs.

Ben Sutton ('80, JD '83) donated $15 million for the construction of the Sutton Sports Performance Center. The four-level, 87,000 square foot facility provides strength and conditioning facilities for all of Wake Forest's student-athletes. Preliminary site work began in October 2017 and was completed in September, 2019. The facility connects to McCreary Field House and the Miller Center. The Sutton Sports Performance Center provides more than 10,000 square feet of dedicated strength and conditioning equipment for football. There is also space for strength and conditioning equipment for men's and women's Olympic sports.

The third floor of the Sutton Sports Performance Center includes 17,000 square feet of meeting rooms, coaches offices and a heritage area for the men's and women's basketball program. The fourth floor has over 18,000 square feet for football coaches offices, team meeting rooms and a heritage area. Over 1,500 square feet comprises a customized nutrition center. The Shah Basketball Complex, named in honor of Mit Shah ('91) whose $5 million lead gift made the facility possible, includes 24,400 square feet that allows both the men's and women's basketball programs to have dedicated practice areas. The $12 million project features the addition a regulation court that allows both programs to have interconnected practice areas featuring two practice courts and a total of 13 baskets. The Shah Complex features 6,000 square feet of strength and conditioning equipment for both the men's and women's basketball teams.

Postseason

NCAA tournament results
The Demon Deacons have appeared in the NCAA tournament 23 times. Their combined record is 28–23.

NIT results
The Demon Deacons have appeared in the National Invitation Tournament (NIT) six times. Their combined record is 12–6. They were NIT champions in 2000.

Awards and honors

Retired numbers

Coaches honored 
Head coaches that have been honored with their names hanging on the Coliseum rafters:

Awards
National Collegiate Basketball Hall of Fame:
 Billy Packer – 2008
 Tim Duncan – 2017

John R. Wooden Award:
 Tim Duncan – 1997

Frances Pomeroy Naismith Award:
 Muggsy Bogues

McDonald's All-Americans
Chris Paul - 2003 
Al-Farouq Aminu - 2010
Rodney Rogers- 1990

ACC Coach of the Year:
 Murray Greason – 1956
 Bones McKinney – 1960, 1961
 Dave Odom – 1991, 1994, 1995
 Skip Prosser – 2003
 Steve Forbes - 2022

ACC Player of the Year:
 Dickie Hemric – 1954, 1955
 Len Chappell – 1961, 1962
 Charlie Davis – 1971
 Rod Griffin – 1977
 Rodney Rogers – 1993
 Tim Duncan – 1996, 1997
 Josh Howard – 2003
 Alondes Williams - 2022

ACC Rookie of the Year:
 Rodney Rogers – 1991
 Robert O'Kelley – 1998
 Chris Paul – 2004

ACC Most Improved Player of the Year
 John Collins – 2017

All-Americans

All-ACC players
 The players are all first team All-ACC, unless otherwise noted

 (*) Denotes 2nd Team All-ACC
 (**) Denotes 3rd Team All-ACC

Players in the NBA draft

Notable players

Demon Deacons in the Olympics

Naismith Memorial Basketball Hall of Fame

NBA Champions

Current NBA Players 
Al-Farouq Aminu – Orlando Magic
John Collins – Atlanta Hawks 
James Johnson – New Orleans Pelicans
Chris Paul – Phoenix Suns
Ish Smith – Washington Wizards 
Jeff Teague – Milwaukee Bucks
Jake LaRavia - Memphis Grizzlies
Alondes Williams - Brooklyn Nets

Current NBA G League Players  
Jaylen Hoard – Texas Legends
Doral Moore - Delaware Blue Coats

Current Non-NBA professional players 
Bryant Crawford - Hapoel Gilboa Galil (Israel)
Jaylen Hoard (born 1999) - French-American player for Hapoel Tel Aviv of the Israeli Basketball Premier League
Codi Miller-McIntyre - BC Zenit Saint Petersburg (Russia) 
Dinos Mitoglou - Olimpia Milano (Italy)
Devin Thomas – Alba Fehervar (Hungary)

All-time leaders

Points

Rebounds

Assists

Steals

Blocks

References

External links